Mustafa Ok (1925 – 5 January 2009) was a Turkish military officer, politician and former government minister.

Life
Mustafa Ok was born at Koldere village of Saruhanlı ilçe (district) in Manisa Province in 1925. After primary and secondary education in Turgutlu, he graduated from the Turkish Military Academy in 1944. In 1955–1956, he served in the Turkish Brigade in South Korea. In 1962, he resigned from the army, and entered politics. After 1977, he left politics. He died on 5 January 2009 in İzmir .

Mustafa Ok was married and father of three.

Political life
Before resignation from the army, Mustafa Ok wrote an article as a non-journalist writer in Cumhuriyet newspaper within the scope of an article contest. The subject of the contest was "The most important issue of Turkey". His article was titled "The foundation of Villages". He received the first prize in the contest and attracted public attention. After resignation, Mustafa Ok joined the Republican People's Party (CHP) and was elected a deputy of Manisa Province in 1965 for the 13th Parliament of Turkey. He kept his seat in the 14th and 15th Parliament of Turkey up to 5 June 1977. In the 37th government of Turkey, he was appointed Minister of Village Affairs and Cooperatives serving between 26 January 1974 and 17 November 1974.

References

1925 births
People from Saruhanlı
Turkish Military Academy alumni
Turkish military officers
Turkish military personnel of the Korean War
Republican People's Party (Turkey) politicians
Deputies of Manisa
Members of the 13th Parliament of Turkey
Members of the 14th Parliament of Turkey
Members of the 15th Parliament of Turkey
Members of the 37th government of Turkey
Government ministers of Turkey
2009 deaths